This is a list of women artists who were born in South Africa or whose artworks are closely associated with that country.

A
Clare Abbott (active since the 1980s), illustrator
Valerie Adler, painter and designer
Chrysoula Argyros (born 1954), painter
Jane Alexander (born 1959), sculptor, installation artist
Julia Anastasopoulos (born 1983), artist, illustrator, designer, actress
Beth Diane Armstrong (born 1985), sculptor

B
Mary Elizabeth Barber (1818–1899), amateur scientist, painter, poet
Nina Barnett (born 1983), installation artist, now in New York
Myfanwy Bekker (active since the 1970s), painter, ceramist, now living in Plettenberg Bay. 
Deborah Bell (born 1957), painter, sculptor
Frida Blumenberg (born 1935), sculptor
Dineo Seshee Bopape (born 1981), multimedia artist
Candice Breitz (born 1972), artist working with video and photography, educator
Sarah Britten (born 1974), writer, lipstick artist
Rhona Brown (1922–2014), botanical artist

C
Bettie Cilliers-Barnard (1914–2010), abstract painter
Julia Rosa Clark (born 1975), contemporary artist
Gillian Condy (born 1953), botanical artist

D
Angela de Jesus (born 1982), visual artist, curator
Mbali Dhlamini (born 1990)
Ethel May Dixie (1876–1973), botanical artist
Marlene Dumas (born 1953), visual artist, now in Amsterdam

F
Faith47 (born 1979), multimedia artist
Marianne Fannin (1845–1938), Irish botanical artist, worked in South Africa

G
Ambra Gambale (active since 2010), jewellery designer
Allerley Glossop (1870–1955), painter
Sophy Gray (1814–1871), artist, architect
Liza Grobler (born 1974), mixed media artist
Louise Guthrie (1879–1966), botanist, botanical artist

H
Cecil Higgs (1898–1986), painter
Philippa Hobbs (born 1955), art historian, artist
Rosa Hope (1902–1972), English-born South African painter

J
Barbara Jeppe (1921–1999), botanical artist
Svea Josephy (born 1969), fine arts photographer, educator

K
Marlise Keith (born 1972), artist working in ink, pencil, acrylics

L
Maggie Laubser (1886–1973), painter, printmaker
Cythna Letty (1895–1985), botanical artist

M
Noria Mabasa (born 1938), sculptor, ceramist
Esther Mahlangu (born 1935), Ndebele painter
Anja Marais (born 1974), sculptor, multi-disciplinary artist
Judith Mason (1938–2016), painter, mixed media artist, textile designer
Jacki McInnes (born 1966), painter
Nandipha Mntambo (born 1982), sculptor, video artist
Sethembile Msezane (born 1991), visual artist, public speaker and performer
Zanele Muholi (born 1972), photographer, video artist, installation artist

N
Allina Ndebele (born 1939), artist and weaver
Robyn Nesbitt (born 1984), contemporary artist

P
Diana Page (born 1965), installation artist, now in Istanbul
Carolyn Parton (born 1964), contemporary artist
Barbara Pike (born 1933), botanical painter
Karabo Poppy (born 1992), illustrator
Deborah Poynton (born 1970), painter

R
Tracey Rose (born 1974), contemporary artist
Arabella Elizabeth Roupell (1817–1914), British botanical artist working in South Africa

S
Ruth Sacks (born 1977), installation artist
Berni Searle (born 1964), contemporary artist
Mmakgabo Helen Sebidi (born 1943), sculptor and painter in pastel, acrylic and oil paint
Mary Sibande (born 1982), sculptor
Penny Siopis (born 1953), painter, installation artist
Buhlebezwe Siwani (born 1987), multidisciplinary artist
Kathryn Smith (born 1975), artist, curator, researcher
Doreen Southwood (born 1974), multimedia artist
Mary Stainbank (1899–1996), sculptor
Irma Stern (1894–1966), prominent painter
Pamela Stretton (born 1980), digital artist
Maud Sumner (1902–1985), painter

T
Jill Trappler (born 1957), painter, weaver, installation artist
Alys Fane Trotter (1862–1961), Irish poet and artist, remembered for her illustrations of the Cape district

U
Jeannette Unite (born 1964), Earth mining artist, collects minerals, oxides for art materials and photographs industrial sites.

V
Marjorie van Heerden (born 1949), writer, illustrator
Thelma Van Rensburg (born 1969), artist working with ink, pencil and charcoal
Minnette Vári (born 1968), installation artist
Diane Victor (born 1964), artist, printmaker

W
Ellaphie Ward-Hilhorst (1920–1994), botanical artist
Sue Williamson (born 1941), multimedia artist, curator

-
South African
Artists
Artists, women